Gaubald (c. 700 – 23 December 761) was the first bishop of Regensburg after the foundation of the diocese of Regensburg (he had been preceded by a number of episcopi vagantes active in the region). He has been beatified. His name is also spelled Gawibald, Geupald or Gaibald.

Life
He was ordained bishop in Regensburg in 739 by Saint Boniface. Gaubald was also abbot-bishop or mitred abbot of St. Emmeram's Abbey. In 740 he moved the bones of the late Emmeram of Regensburg to the crypt in the later Benedictine abbey. On his own death, Gaubald was buried in the Ramwoldkrypta in the Abbey.

Sources 
 Albert Lehner: Sacerdos = Bischof. Klerikale Hierarchie in der Emmeramsvita. Leipzig 2007.

Roman Catholic bishops of Regensburg
German beatified people
700 births
761 deaths
German abbots
8th-century bishops in Bavaria